Manoj Chanaka (born 17 November 1984) is a Sri Lankan cricketer. He has played 37 first-class and 29 List A matches for several domestic sides in Sri Lanka since 2000/01. His last first-class match was for Panadura Sports Club in the 2010–11 Premier Trophy on 18 March 2011.

See also
 List of Chilaw Marians Cricket Club players

References

External links
 

1984 births
Living people
Sri Lankan cricketers
Burgher Recreation Club cricketers
Chilaw Marians Cricket Club cricketers
Moors Sports Club cricketers
Panadura Sports Club cricketers
Place of birth missing (living people)